The term Goryeo language may refer to:

 Middle Korean, the historical form of Korean spoken during the Goryeo dynasty
 Koryo-mar, the dialect of Korean spoken by ethnic Koreans in the former USSR
 Goguryeo language, the language spoken in the kingdom of Goguryeo